Alme is a surname. Notable people with the surname include: 

 Iselin Alme (born 1957), Norwegian singer and stage actress
 Joel Alme (born 1980), Swedish singer
 Kurt Alme, American attorney
 Øystein Alme (born 1960), Norwegian author